While observers can easily confuse common wasps and bees at a distance or without close observation, there are many different characteristics of large bees and wasps that can be used to identify them.


See also

 Schmidt sting pain index

Notes and references

Further reading

External links
What's Buzzin' in My Garden?
Differences between wasps and bees poster

Bees
Wasps
Scientific comparisons